Jaan Kurgemaa (1894–1937) was an Estonian politician. He was a member of I Riigikogu. He was a member of the Riigikogu since 5 April 1921. He replaced Jaan Reinberg. On 10 May 1921, he resigned his position and he was replaced by Mihkel Haus.

References

1894 births
1937 deaths
Central Committee of Tallinn Trade Unions politicians
Members of the Riigikogu, 1920–1923